Erik Crone (22 November 1946 – 14 October 2022) was a Danish film producer and father of Natasja Crone Back.

References

External links

1946 births
2022 deaths
Danish film producers
People from Copenhagen